KHTT (106.9 FM, "106.9 K-HITS") is a top 40 mainstream (CHR) radio station licensed to Muskogee, Oklahoma, and serving the Tulsa metropolitan area.  It is owned by Griffin Communications.  The radio studios are located in Downtown Tulsa and the transmitter is south of Bixby.

KHTT broadcasts using HD Radio technology.  The HD-2 digital subchannel carries the sports radio format of co-owned KTSB 1170 AM.

History

KHTT was originally KMMM, and it was also known as "K-Triple M" (the three Ms in its call letters, which also stood for "Muskogee's Music Machine") and at times it was called "The New K107 FM". It targeted only Muskogee and the surrounding areas at the time. Very little format history is known for KMMM; one of the formats known for the station is urban contemporary. The station mixed in a few top 40 songs during the daytime and aired a straight ahead Urban presentation by evenings. By 1982 KMMM went dark.

In 1982, the station signed back on the air with an upgrade in its signal now allowing it to target Tulsa. It changed its format to a full length Top 40/CHR format and became known as KAYI but still kept the moniker as "K107 FM". In the early '90s, KAYI evolved in an Adult CHR direction, but the change did not bring success. In November 1993, the station changed its call letters to KHTT and its slogan to "K-HITS." It remained an adult-leaning top 40 station for a few more years. Then in the summer of 1996, "K-HITS" shifted to a more mainstream top 40 format, which it has since used with an astounding success.

Ownership changes
In April 1988 Renda Broadcasting of Pittsburgh, PA purchased then KAYI-FM (K107) from the ill-fated Narragansett Broadcasting Company of Rhode Island. Shortly after the deal closed, Renda moved its existing Tulsa station, then AC KBEZ into the same facility as K107.

On March 8, 2012, Renda announced that it was selling KHTT and KBEZ to Journal Communications for $11.8 million. The deal closed on June 25, 2012. Both KHTT and its sister KBEZ have moved into the Journal Communications facility at 29th and Yale Avenue adjacent to the Broken Arrow Expressway joining the existing Journal stations KVOO, KXBL, and KFAQ after residing at 7030 S Yale, Suite 711 for nearly 30 years.

Journal Communications (KHTT's former owner) and the E. W. Scripps Company (owner of NBC's local affiliate KJRH-TV) announced on July 30, 2014 that the two companies would merge to create a new broadcast company under the E. W. Scripps Company name that will own the two companies' broadcast properties, including KHTT. The transaction was approved.

On June 26, 2018, parent company E. W. Scripps announced that it would sell KHTT - along with its sister stations, KBEZ, KFAQ, KVOO, and KXBL to Griffin Communications. Griffin began operating the stations under a local marketing agreement on July 30, and completed the purchase October 1; the company already owned CBS affiliate KOTV-DT and CW affiliate KQCW-DT.

Gunman
On Jan. 13, 2010 just after 1 p.m., 58-year-old Barry Styles brought a gun to the offices of KHTT and sister station KBEZ, and walked up and down the hallways demanding to speak to KBEZ morning show DJ Carly Rush. When the receptionist informed the man she had left for the day, he walked out of the office then immediately returned brandishing a pistol. The receptionist escaped to the back of the office and called the Tulsa Police Department. The gunman trapped the employees inside the office and guarded the exit. After approximately 10 minutes, the police department had arrived on scene. When the gunman refused to drop his weapon, police fired shots hitting him in the waist. Shortly after, the police handcuffed the man and he was taken to a hospital where he was listed as being in serious condition.

Call sign history
Current call sign:   KHTT  
Facility ID Number:   55704  
Call Sign: Begin Date:  
KMMM      (unknown date) 
KAYI      07/26/1982 
KHTT      11/01/1993

Slogans
"All The Hits!" (1993–1996, 2011–2016)
"Today's Best Music!" (1996–2004)
"The New #1 Hit Music Station!" (2004–2010)
"Tulsa's New #1 Hit Music Station!" (2016–2018)
"Tulsa's #1 Hit Music Station!" (2018–present)

References

External links
KHTT station website
MySpace page
K HITS 106.9 FM

HTT
Contemporary hit radio stations in the United States
Griffin Media